The Eyeo Festival is a yearly conference for artists who work with data and code. It takes place in Minneapolis. The conference began in 2011, and has taken place yearly since then, typically at the Walker Art Center. Due to the COVID-19 pandemic, the event was put on pause for 2020 and 2021.

Organizers and speakers 
The event is organized by Dave Schroeder, Jer Thorp, Caitlin Rae Hargarten, and Wes Grubs.

The conference features speakers who work in data visualization, creative coders and  hackers. Past speakers include Amanda Cox, Stefanie Posavec and Giorgia Lupi (who met at eyeo in 2013), Mike Bostock, Nicholas Felton, Adam Harvey, Paola Antonelli, Roman Verostko, Frieder Nake, Lillian Schwartz, Fernanda Viégas and Martin Wattenberg, Ben Fry, Rachel Binx, Moritz Stefaner, Jenny Odell, Lauren McCarthy, Kyle McDonald, Samuel Sinyangwe, Zachary Lieberman, Golan Levin, Everest Pipkin, Meredith Whittaker, Catherine D'Ignazio, Nadieh Bremer.

References 

Conferences in the United States
Annual events in Minnesota
Computer conferences
Technology conferences
Festivals in Minnesota